Laxman Sreekumar (born 15 May 1987) is an Indian-born cricketer who played for the United Arab Emirates national cricket team. He made his first-class debut for the United Arab Emirates against Hong Kong in the 2015–17 ICC Intercontinental Cup tournament on 11 November 2015. He made his One Day International debut against Hong Kong in the 2015–17 ICC World Cricket League Championship on 16 November 2015. He made his Twenty20 International (T20I) debut for the United Arab Emirates against Papua New Guinea on 14 April 2017.

References

External links
 

1987 births
Living people
Emirati cricketers
United Arab Emirates One Day International cricketers
United Arab Emirates Twenty20 International cricketers
People from Kottayam district
Cricketers from Kerala
Indian emigrants to the United Arab Emirates
Indian expatriate sportspeople in the United Arab Emirates